"Lonely Together" is a song by Swedish DJ Avicii, featuring vocals from English singer Rita Ora. The song was released on 11 August 2017 as the second single from Avicii's EP, Avīci (01). A remix EP was released on 17 November 2017. "Lonely Together" was the last single Avicii released during his lifetime, before his death in 2018.

Live performances
Ora performed "Lonely Together" at 538 Koningsdag festival in the Netherlands, a week after Avicii's death. She dedicated her performance to the DJ and held a moment of silence. On 27 May, at BBC's Biggest Weekend, she also paid tribute to Avicii.

Track listings
Digital download
 "Lonely Together" (featuring Rita Ora) – 3:01

Digital download – acoustic
"Lonely Together" (featuring Rita Ora) (acoustic) – 3:01

Digital download – remixes
 "Lonely Together" (featuring Rita Ora) (Alan Walker remix) – 2:59
 "Lonely Together" (featuring Rita Ora) (DJ Licious remix) – 3:04
 "Lonely Together" (featuring Rita Ora) (Jaded remix) – 3:36
 "Lonely Together" (featuring Rita Ora) (Dexter remix) – 3:03

Charts

Weekly charts

Year-end charts

Certifications

Release history

References

2017 singles
2017 songs
Avicii songs
Rita Ora songs
Song recordings produced by Avicii
Songs written by Avicii
Number-one singles in Scotland
Songs written by Brian Lee (songwriter)
Songs written by Benny Blanco
Songs written by Ali Tamposi
Songs written by Cashmere Cat
Songs written by Andrew Watt (record producer)
Song recordings produced by Cashmere Cat
Song recordings produced by Benny Blanco
Music videos shot in Ukraine